Baldwinville is an unincorporated village and census-designated place (CDP) in the town of Templeton in Worcester County, Massachusetts, United States. The population was 2,028 at the 2010 census. The name also refers to the local post office or railroad station.

Geography

Baldwinville is located at  (42.610167, -72.075239).

According to the United States Census Bureau, the CDP has a total area of 6.5 km (2.5 mi²), of which 6.4 km (2.5 mi²) is land and 0.1 km (0.04 mi²) (0.80%) is water.

Demographics

At the 2000 census there were 1,852 people, 677 households, and 465 families in the CDP. The population density was 288.3/km (748.1/mi²). There were 700 housing units at an average density of 109.0/km (282.8/mi²).  The racial makeup of the CDP was 97.84% White, 0.16% Black or African American, 0.16% Native American, 0.49% Asian, 0.81% from other races, and 0.54% from two or more races. Hispanic or Latino of any race were 1.78%.

Of the 677 households 33.8% had children under the age of 18 living with them, 51.4% were married couples living together, 11.1% had a female householder with no husband present, and 31.3% were non-families. 26.1% of households were one person and 16.5% were one person aged 65 or older. The average household size was 2.58 and the average family size was 3.07.

The age distribution was 26.7% under the age of 18, 6.5% from 18 to 24, 29.5% from 25 to 44, 18.3% from 45 to 64, and 19.1% 65 or older. The median age was 37 years. For every 100 females, there were 89.0 males. For every 100 females age 18 and over, there were 83.6 males.

The median household income was $41,771 and the median family income  was $50,170. Males had a median income of $37,542 versus $25,551 for females. The per capita income for the CDP was $17,108. About 6.0% of families and 9.6% of the population were below the poverty line, including 9.3% of those under age 18 and 18.2% of those age 65 or over.

References

Census-designated places in Worcester County, Massachusetts
Census-designated places in Massachusetts